Denis Marshall Haynes (29 December 1923 – 26 November 2012) was an English cricketer.  Haynes was a right-handed batsman who bowled right-arm medium pace.  He was born at Stoke-on-Trent, Staffordshire and was educated at Denstone College, and later St Catharine's College, Cambridge.

Haynes made his debut for Staffordshire following the Second World War in the 1946 Minor Counties Championship against Cheshire.  Haynes played Minor counties cricket for Staffordshire from 1946 to 1957, making 90 appearances.

He made his only first-class appearance for the Marylebone Cricket Club against Oxford University in 1956.  In the MCC first-innings, he was run out for 8, while in their second-innings he was dismissed for a duck by Jimmy Allan.

He died at Thetford, Norfolk, on 26 November 2012.

References

External links
Denis Haynes at ESPNcricinfo
Denis Haynes at CricketArchive

1923 births
2012 deaths
Cricketers from Stoke-on-Trent
People educated at Denstone College
Alumni of St Catharine's College, Cambridge
English cricketers
Staffordshire cricketers
Staffordshire cricket captains
Marylebone Cricket Club cricketers